Hypsibarbus myitkyinae is a species of ray-finned fish in the genus Hypsibarbus from the upper Irrawaddy River drainage, as well as the Bago River drainage in Myanmar.

Footnotes 

 

Myitkyinae
Fish described in 1929